Miloš Petrović (Serbian Cyrillic: Милош Петровић; born 5 May 1990) is a Serbian professional footballer who plays as a defender for Bulgarian club Lokomotiv Plovdiv.

Career
Petrović began his career at Radnički Niš, where he played over 200 games between 2007 and 2018. After eleven seasons at Radnički he left to join Bulgarian First League club Lokomotiv Plovdiv on 16 July 2018. With Lokomotiv, he won the 2018–19 and the 2019–20 Bulgarian Cup.

Career statistics

Honours

Club
Lokomotiv Plovdiv
 Bulgarian Cup (2): 2018–19, 2019–20
 Bulgarian Supercup: 2020

References

External links

Living people
1990 births
Serbian footballers
FK Radnički Niš players
PFC Lokomotiv Plovdiv players
Serbian First League players
Serbian SuperLiga players
First Professional Football League (Bulgaria) players
Expatriate footballers in Bulgaria
Association football defenders
Sportspeople from Niš